The Kwasa Sentral station is a Mass Rapid Transit (MRT) station serving the future development project known as Kwasa Damansara in Section U4 of Shah Alam, Selangor, Malaysia. It is one of the stations of the MRT Kajang Line, formerly known as  MRT Sungai Buloh–Kajang Line and was opened on 16 December 2016 under Phase One operations of the line.

Station Features

The Kwasa Sentral station is an elevated station with the same standard elevated station design which was adopted for the MRT Sungai Buloh-Kajang Line. Attached to the station are a major feeder bus terminal and a 500 parking-bay at-grade park and ride facility.

Station location

The station is located within the future Kwasa Damansara development. It is one of two stations - the other is Kwasa Damansara - which were built to serve the development. Currently, other than the station and its park and ride facility, there are no other buildings in the vicinity.

As the station is located away from Jalan Sungai Buloh (Malay; English: Sungai Buloh Road), access to the station is via a newly constructed road leading from the Jalan Sungai Buloh-Persiaran Sungai Buloh intersection.

Station layout

Exits and entrances
The station is designed with two entrances - Entrance A and Entrance B - but currently, only Entrance A is in use, leading to the feeder bus stop, taxi lay-by, drop-off area and the park and ride facility. Entrance B is currently closed and will be opened when the area on the east side of the station is developed.

History
During the early stages of construction prior to the finalisation of station names, Kwasa Sentral station was known by the working name Taman Industri Sungai Buloh.

Feeder Bus Services
With the opening of the Kajang Line, feeder buses also began operating linking the station with several housing areas in Kota Damansara and Subang (Section U3 and U5, Shah Alam). The feeder buses operate from the station's feeder bus hub adjacent to the station.

Gallery

See also
MRT Kajang Line
Kwasa Damansara

References

External links
 Kwasa Sentral MRT station | mrt.com.my
 Klang Valley Mass Rapid Transit

Rapid transit stations in Selangor
Sungai Buloh-Kajang Line
Railway stations opened in 2016